Rayne Pinto de Assis (born 17 January 1997), known as Rayne, is a Brazilian footballer who plays as a central defender for Paraná, on loan of Figueirense.

Career statistics

Honours
Red Bull Bragantino
Campeonato Brasileiro Série B: 2019

Notes and references
Notes

References

External links

Association football defenders
Brazilian footballers
Campeonato Brasileiro Série B players
Campeonato Brasileiro Série C players
Campeonato Brasileiro Série D players
Red Bull Brasil players
Clube Atlético Joseense players
Red Bull Bragantino players
Associação Ferroviária de Esportes players
Figueirense FC players
Paraná Clube players
Living people
1997 births
People from Vitória, Espírito Santo
Sportspeople from Espírito Santo